No Time for Figleaves is a 1965 comedy play written by Duncan Greenwood and Robert King. The play was published by Samuel French in 1966 in London.

Synopsis

The play is about women running the world. An atomic accident has resulted in the disappearance of all men. All that is, but two who were protected in an underground shelter. The women keep these potential super-mates under close guard, spurred on by the thought of a whole world full of desirable women at their disposal, the men try to escape.

Characters

Monica Sharp - Constance's Private Secretary
Constance Claythorpe - The P.M.
Dora - The Servant
Lydia Parler - M.P. Minister of Science
Nigel Lawler - RAF Wing Commander
Major Danvers - Bishop, W.R.A.C.
David Maxton - Professor
Helen Marchbanks - W.R.N.S., 1st Lord of the Admiralty
Eve Forster - Corporal, W.R.A.C.

1965 plays